Al-Khafaji is an Arabic surname that denotes a relationship to or from Khafajah, Diyala Governorate. Notable people with the surname include:
 Ala'a Hussein Ali Al-Khafaji Al-Jaber (born c. 1948), Kuwaiti politician
 Isam al Khafaji (born 1950), Iraqi political economist, historian and left wing intellectual
 Mohammed Al-Khafaji (born 1994), Iraqi rower
 Shakir al Khafaji (born 1955), Iraqi-American businessman
 Shihab al-Din al-Khafaji (1569–1659), Egyptian imam

Arabic-language surnames
Surnames of Iraqi origin
Surnames of Kuwaiti origin
Surnames of Egyptian origin